Phlaeothrips is a genus of thrips in the family Phlaeothripidae.

Species
 Phlaeothrips amphicinctus
 Phlaeothrips amplicincta
 Phlaeothrips anacardii
 Phlaeothrips annulicornis
 Phlaeothrips annulipes
 Phlaeothrips bacauensis
 Phlaeothrips bispinoides
 Phlaeothrips bispinosus
 Phlaeothrips coriaceus
 Phlaeothrips denticauda
 Phlaeothrips gallicus
 Phlaeothrips glabrigenis
 Phlaeothrips guriensis
 Phlaeothrips mauiensis
 Phlaeothrips minor
 Phlaeothrips nilgiricus
 Phlaeothrips pillichianus
 Phlaeothrips poecilus
 †Phlaeothrips schlechtendali
 Phlaeothrips spurius
 Phlaeothrips subglaber
 Phlaeothrips sycomori
 Phlaeothrips tristis
 Phlaeothrips varius

References

Phlaeothripidae
Thrips
Thrips genera